A keratin disease is a genetic disorder of one of the keratin genes. An example is monilethrix. The first to be identified was epidermolysis bullosa simplex.

Pathology
Examples of keratin disease include:

See also 
 List of cutaneous conditions caused by mutations in keratins

References

Cytoskeletal defects